Gregory Randolph (born December 12, 1972) is an American former cyclist. He competed in the men's individual road race at the 1996 Summer Olympics.

References

External links
 

1972 births
Living people
American male cyclists
Olympic cyclists of the United States
Cyclists at the 1996 Summer Olympics
Sportspeople from Denver